Juan Gabriel Patiño Martinez (born 20 May 1989) is a Paraguayan international footballer who plays for Cerro Porteño as a centre-back.

Career
Patiño has played club football for Guarani.

He was called to be international with Paraguay in September 2015.

References

External links
 

1989 births
Living people
Paraguayan footballers
Paraguayan expatriate footballers
Paraguay international footballers
Association football central defenders
Association football fullbacks
Club Guaraní players
Chiapas F.C. footballers
Racing Club de Avellaneda footballers
Club Atlético Belgrano footballers
Club Olimpia footballers
Cerro Porteño players
Argentine Primera División players
Paraguayan Primera División players
Liga MX players
Paraguayan expatriate sportspeople in Argentina
Paraguayan expatriate sportspeople in Mexico
Expatriate footballers in Argentina
Expatriate footballers in Mexico